Foxcatcher Farm Covered Bridge, also known as Big Elk Creek Covered Bridge and Fair Hill Covered Bridge, is a Burr truss wooden covered bridge near Fair Hill, Maryland, United States.

History
The bridge crosses Big Elk Creek and is surrounded by the Fair Hill Natural Resources Management Area, the former land holdings of William du Pont Jr. The crossing was originally called Strahorn's Mill Bridge after Strahorn's Mill - one of the properties purchased by William du Pont Jr. in 1927 to create his Foxcatcher Farm estate, which was named after his thoroughbred racing stable.

The bridge was originally constructed in 1860 by Ferdinand Wood and was substantially reconstructed in 1992. Foxcatcher Farm Covered Bridge was designated as a Maryland Historic Civil Engineering Landmark by the American Society of Civil Engineers in 1994.

See also
 List of covered bridges in Maryland

References

External links
 Big Elk Creek Covered Bridge, (Fair Hill Covered Bridge, Foxcatcher Farm Covered Bridge) at Maryland Historical Trust
 Fair Hill Estate Historic District, (Fair Hill Natural Resources Management Area)) at Maryland Historical Trust

Bridges in Cecil County, Maryland
Covered bridges in Maryland
Burr Truss bridges in the United States
Historic Civil Engineering Landmarks
Tourist attractions in Cecil County, Maryland
Wooden bridges in Maryland